Yandare (Yandare) is a rural locality (a selo) in Nazranovsky District of the Republic of Ingushetia, Russia. It forms the municipality of the rural settlement of Yandare as the only settlement in its composition.

Geography 
The village is located on both banks of the Yandyrka River, just above its confluence with Sunzha, 7.5 km northeast of the regional center — the city of Nazran and 15 km northeast of the city of Magas.

The nearest settlements: in the north — the city of Karabulak, in the northeast — the stanitsa of Troitskaya, in the southeast - the stanitsa of Nesterovskaya, in the south - the village of Surkhakhi, in the southwest - the village of Ekazhevo and in the west - the villages of Gazi-Yurt and Plievo.

History 

The territory of Yandare, together with the villages of Gazi-Yurt, Surkhakhi, Ekazhevo, Ali-Yurt and the modern city of Magas, forms one of the largest archaeological complexes of the ancient settlements of the Alanian period, where, according to Ingush researchers, the historical city of Magas, the capital of the medieval state of Alania, was located, which included the territory of modern Ingushetia.

By 1772 the Karabulaks had mastered the lower reaches of the Assa River and the Yandyr area, founding the villages of Great and Little Yandyr.

In May-June 1825, there was an uprising of the inhabitants of the village of Yandare — Karabulaks and Ingush proper, under the leadership of foreman Dzhambulat Tsechoev, an associate of Beibulat Taimiev, which was suppressed and ended with the arrest and brutal execution of Tsechoev by order of General A. P. Yermolov.

In 1833, an uprising broke out in Yandare, led by Dzhankhot Azamatov. In July of the same year, it was suppressed by troops. The houses of Dzhanhot Azamatov and his relatives were burned down. The destruction of the entire village was stopped due to the intercession of the Nazran Ingush.

In the period from 1944 to 1958, after the deportation of Chechens and Ingush and the abolition of the Chechen-Ingush ASSR, the village was called Raydzast. After the rehabilitation and return of the Ingush people to Ingushetia, the village was returned to its historical name — Yandare.

Infrastructure 
The village has one central and 4 jamaat mosques, 3 secondary schools, madrasa, a House of Culture, as well as a village library and an outpatient clinic. Not far from the mosque there is a stele dedicated to the participants of the Great Patriotic War of 1941-1945.

References

Bibliography 
 
 
 
 
 
 

Rural localities in Ingushetia